Reinhold Oscar Albert Schmidt (1897–1974) was a UFO contactee and convicted fraudster.

Flying Saucer contact claims 

Schmidt was born and grew up in Nebraska, where he worked for most of his adult life as a grain buyer and dealer. In 1938, he was convicted of embezzlement and was imprisoned in the Nebraska State Penitentiary.  According to Schmidt, on November 5, 1957, while driving through a rural area near Kearney, Nebraska, he saw a large, blimp-shaped object on the ground in a field. He claimed two men left the object and escorted him inside it. On board witnessed a group of four men and two women speaking a language he described as "High German." The group claimed to be from the planet Venus. After a conversation lasting about thirty minutes, Schmidt left the craft and it took off into the air, revealing large propellers at each end.

Schmidt contacted the local sheriff immediately following the experience, and brought two local police officers to view the supposed landing site, where a greasy, greenish substance was found. That same evening he began publicizing his story via telephone and radio interviews and a television appearance, but the police were skeptical, and held him overnight in jail while they continued their investigation. After uncovering his past conviction and finding a can of green motor oil near the site; they transferred him to the Hastings State Hospital for a psychiatric evaluation.

Publicity 
Schmidt traveled with contactees Wayne Sulo Aho and John Otto on their lecture circuit and published an account of his experiences in 1958 entitled The Kearney Incident Up To Now: The Report of Reinhold Schmidt. He also contacted movie producers June and Ron Ormond about making a film based on his alleged experiences. The film, Edge of Tomorrow, premiered on May 28, 1961 at the Wilshire Ebell Theatre in Los Angeles. Shortly after this, Schmidt's booklet was republished under the title Edge of Tomorrow. Schmidt also had a minor role in another film produced by the Ormonds, the exploitation film Please Don't Touch Me.

Trial and conviction 
Schmidt relocated to Bakersfield, California, where he continued to present lectures for the next few years, soliciting money from elderly women in his audience that he claimed he would use to mine unique crystals identified for him by his space contacts. He went on trial in late 1961 for grand theft, charged with tricking several elderly women out of over $30,000 by claiming that flying saucers had directed him to a mine full of "free energy crystals."  The prosecution called Carl Sagan to testify that Saturn could not support life. Sagan wrote about the trial in his 1966 book Intelligent Life in the Universe, using the pseudonym "Henry Winckler" for Schmidt. Schmidt insisted that the jury be shown his film Edge of Tomorrow, in what was probably its final screening. Schmidt was convicted on October 26, 1961, and sentenced in June 1963 to a term of one to ten years in prison.

Following his release from prison, Schmidt returned to Nebraska, where he died in 1974.

References

External links 
The Saucers That Time Forgot: The Trial of a UFO Gold Digger, a detailed account of the Reinhold O. Schmidt saucer story, including his crimes, trial, conviction, and post-prison life.
The Kearney Incident Up to Now, Schmidt's first booklet.
"The Reinhold Schmidt Story", in AFSCA World Report no. 13-15 (Jan.-Jan. 1960), another account of Schmidt's contacts.
 .

1897 births
1974 deaths
Contactees
American people convicted of fraud